"Holdin' Heaven" is a song written by Bill Kenner and Thom McHugh, and recorded by American country music artist Tracy Byrd that reached the top of the Billboard, giving Byrd his first Number One single.  It was released in May 1993 as the third single from his self-titled debut album.

Critical reception
Larry Flick, of Billboard magazine reviewed the song by calling it "a brassy, hard-driving rhythm and a tale of monumentally lucking out."

Music video
The music video takes place at a Wild West Rodeo. It was directed by Gerry Wenner.

Chart performance
This song debuted at number 72 on the Hot Country Singles & Tracks chart dated June 19, 1993. It climbed to Number One in September 1993, holding the top spot for one week. In addition, this was Byrd's first Billboard Number One, and his only Number One single until mid-2002, when he topped the charts again with "Ten Rounds with José Cuervo".

Charts

Year-end charts

References

1993 singles
Tracy Byrd songs
Song recordings produced by Tony Brown (record producer)
MCA Records singles
Songs written by Bill Kenner
Songs written by Thom McHugh
1993 songs